Mariano Peluffo (born April 1, 1971 in Buenos Aires) is an Argentine television presenter.

He began his career as a producer in El Agujerito Sin Fin, a children's programme of Canal 13 in the 90s with Julián Weich.

His most famous work was in the Gran Hermano's programmes (Big Brothers) (two in 2001 and one in 2002/2003). Between 2003 and 2007, Peluffo worked in Zoobichos, Sentí el Verano and Vamos a Ganar. On January 9, 2007 he returned to Gran Hermano with the fourth edition and during 2007, Peluffo worked in two more Gran Hermanos (Big Brothers); Gran Hermano Famosos (Big Brother Celebrities) and Gran Hermano 5 (Big Brother 5). He is currently working in Gran Hermano 2011 (Big Brother 2011).

Peluffo worked in a new programme called ¿Por qué no te callas? (Why don't you shut up?), a debate programme with family situations.
He also worked in "Talento Argentino" (Argentinian Talent), the Argentinian version of Got Talent. He has been host of the first Argentinian edition of MasterChef.

References

External links
  Peluffo's official page - In Spanish
  Mariano Peluffo  - Peluffo in IMDb.

1971 births
Living people
Argentine journalists
Male journalists
Gran Hermano (Argentine TV series)
Argentine television presenters
Argentine television producers